The Golden Arrow (1936) is an American comedy film directed by Alfred E. Green and starring Bette Davis and George Brent. The screenplay by Charles Kenyon is based on a story of the same title by Michael Arlen published in the September 14, 1935 issue of Liberty.

Plot
Johnny Jones (Brent) is a penniless newspaper reporter assigned to interview Daisy Appleby (Davis), heiress to the Appleby Facial Creams fortune and the target of numerous suitors anxious to latch onto her wealth. What neither they nor Johnny know is that she is really a cafeteria cashier hired by a public relations team to impersonate the socialite.

She proposes a marriage of convenience that will free her from the cads pursuing her so she can find her ideal man and allow Johnny leisure time to finish his novel. He agrees, and after they wed the company's board of directors try to place him under their control, as well. When Johnny rebels and begins dating oil heiress Hortense Burke-Meyers in retaliation, Daisy, who realizes she truly loves him, tries to win him back by having her brother-in-law Alfred Parker impersonate an old beau in an effort to make Johnny jealous.

Cast
 Bette Davis as Daisy Appleby 
 George Brent as Johnny Jones 
 Eugene Pallette as Mr. Meyers 
 Dick Foran as Tommy Blake
 Craig Reynolds as Jorgenson  
 Carol Hughes as Hortense Burke-Meyers 
 Hobart Cavanaugh as DeWolfe
 Earle Foxe as Alfred Parker

Production
Although audience reaction to the film, originally titled Cream Princess, at a preview in Long Beach, California was dismal, Warner Bros. rushed it into release to capitalize on the Academy Award leading lady Bette Davis recently had won for Dangerous.

The actress was upset with the publicity for the film, which she thought was ridiculous, and included mention of her Oscar win. "This film was the beginning of the end, temporarily, of my contract with Warner Bros.," she later recalled. "I was actually insulted to have to appear in such a cheap, nothing story as The Golden Arrow after Of Human Bondage, The Petrified Forest, and Bordertown."

Critical reception
In his review in The New York Times, Frank S. Nugent observed, "With this and that device, with a deal of patterned dialogue and the transparent air of a man who recognizes the unimportance of what he has to say and yet prides himself on telling it so well that you will not mind, The Golden Arrow drifts rather pleasantly across the screen. It derives most of its slight strength as entertainment from the saucy performance of Miss Davis and the harried, but good-natured, expression of Mr. Brent."

Time described the film as "a minor comedy" and added "Although Miss Davis still can make her eyes pop and her lips droop, The Golden Arrow proves nothing more than that she is adept at nonchalance."

References

External links
 
 
 
 

1936 films
1936 comedy films
American comedy films
American black-and-white films
Films directed by Alfred E. Green
Warner Bros. films
Films based on short fiction
Films produced by Samuel Bischoff
1930s American films
1930s English-language films
English-language comedy films